St. Peter am Perlach or Perlach-Church is a romanesque Catholic church in the center of Augsburg (Bavaria). The tower of the church, the Perlachturm, is together with the Augsburg Town Hall the landmark of Augsburg.

Mary Untier of Knots 

The image and Marian devotion in St. Peter Mary Untier of Knots is also known in Latin America miraculous image of Mary Knots. A copy of the painting is in San José del Talar a church in Buenos Aires (Argentina).

See also 
 The Turamichele of Perlachtower
 List of Jesuit sites

External links 
 St. Peter am Perlach - (Official site)

References

11th-century Roman Catholic church buildings in Germany
Romanesque architecture in Germany
Roman Catholic cathedrals in Bavaria
Augsburg
Buildings and structures in Augsburg